Arvils Ašeradens (born 30 December 1962 in Riga) is a Latvian politician who was a former Minister for Economics and Deputy Prime Minister in the Kučinskis cabinet.

Education
Ašeradens received a master's degree in Economic Geography from the University of Latvia in 1986.

Other activities
 World Bank, Ex-Officio Alternate Member of the Board of Governors

See also 

 Ministry of Economics (Latvia)

References

1962 births
Living people
Politicians from Riga
Civic Union (Latvia) politicians
New Unity politicians
Ministers of Economics of Latvia
Deputies of the 10th Saeima
Deputies of the 11th Saeima
Deputies of the 12th Saeima
Deputies of the 13th Saeima
Deputies of the 14th Saeima
University of Latvia alumni